State assembly elections were held in Malaysia on 8 July 1978 in all states except Kelantan, Sabah and Sarawak. Kelantan held its state assembly election months earlier on 11 March 1978.

Results

Johore

|-
! rowspan=2 colspan=4 style="background-color:#E9E9E9;text-align:center;" | Party
! rowspan=2 style="background-color:#E9E9E9;text-align:center;" |Candidates
! colspan=2 style="background-color:#E9E9E9;text-align:center;" |Vote
! colspan=3 style="background-color:#E9E9E9;text-align:center;" |Seats
|-
! style="background-color:#E9E9E9;text-align:center;" |Votes
! style="background-color:#E9E9E9;text-align:center;" |%
! style="background-color:#E9E9E9;text-align:center;" |Won
! style="background-color:#E9E9E9;text-align:center;" |%
! style="background-color:#E9E9E9;text-align:center;" |+/–
|- 
| style="background-color: ;" |
| colspan=2 style="text-align:left;" | National Front || BN || 32 ||  ||  || 31 || 96.88 || 0
|-style="background:#EFEFEF;"
| rowspan=3|
| style="background-color: #E62020;" | 
| style="text-align:left;" |United Malays National Organisation || UMNO ||  ||  ||  || 20 || 62.50 || 0
|-style="background:#EFEFEF;"
| style="background-color: #0000FF;" | 
| style="text-align:left;" |Malaysian Chinese Association || MCA ||  ||  ||  || 10 || 31.25 || 0
|-style="background:#EFEFEF;"
| style="background-color: #29AB87;" |
| style="text-align:left;" |Malaysian Indian Congress || MIC ||  ||  ||  || 1 || 3.13 || 0
|-
| style="background-color: ;" |
| colspan=2 style="text-align:left;" |Democratic Action Party||DAP||  ||  ||  || 1 || 3.13 || 0
|-
| style="background-color: ;" |
| colspan=2 style="text-align:left;" |Pan-Malaysian Islamic Party|| PAS ||  ||  ||  || 0 || 0.00 || 0
|-
| style="text-align:left;" colspan="5" |Valid votes||  ||rowspan=2 colspan="4" style="background-color:#dcdcdc"|
|-
| style="text-align:left;" colspan="5" |Invalid/blank votes||
|-
| colspan="5" style="text-align:left;" | Total votes (voter turnout: %) ||   || 100.00 || 32 || 100.00 || 0
|-
| style="text-align:left;" colspan="5" |Did not vote||  ||rowspan="4" colspan="4" style="background-color:#dcdcdc"|
|-
| style="text-align:left;" colspan="5" |Registered voters|| 
|-
| style="text-align:left;" colspan="5" |Voting age population (aged 21 years and above)|| 
|-
| style="text-align:left;" colspan="5" |Johore's population|| 
|-
| style="text-align:left;" colspan=10 |
Source:
|}

Kedah

|-
! rowspan=2 colspan=4 style="background-color:#E9E9E9;text-align:center;" | Party
! rowspan=2 style="background-color:#E9E9E9;text-align:center;" |Candidates
! colspan=2 style="background-color:#E9E9E9;text-align:center;" |Vote
! colspan=3 style="background-color:#E9E9E9;text-align:center;" |Seats
|-
! style="background-color:#E9E9E9;text-align:center;" |Votes
! style="background-color:#E9E9E9;text-align:center;" |%
! style="background-color:#E9E9E9;text-align:center;" |Won
! style="background-color:#E9E9E9;text-align:center;" |%
! style="background-color:#E9E9E9;text-align:center;" |+/–
|-
| style="background-color: ;" |
| colspan=2 style="text-align:left;" | National Front || BN || 26 ||  ||  || 19 || 73.08 || -5
|-style="background:#EFEFEF;"
| rowspan=3|
| style="background-color: #E62020;" | 
| style="text-align:left;" |United Malays National Organisation || UMNO ||  ||  ||  || 14 || 53.85 || +2
|-style="background:#EFEFEF;"
| style="background-color: #0000FF;" | 
| style="text-align:left;" |Malaysian Chinese Association || MCA ||  ||  ||  || 4 || 15.38 || +2
|-style="background:#EFEFEF;"
| style="background-color: #29AB87;" |
| style="text-align:left;" |Malaysian Indian Congress || MIC ||  ||  ||  || 1 || 3.85 || +1
|-
| style="background-color: ;" |
| colspan=2 style="text-align:left;" |Pan-Malaysian Islamic Party|| PAS ||  ||  ||  || 7 || 26.92 || -2
|-
| style="text-align:left;" colspan="5" |Valid votes||  ||rowspan=2 colspan="4" style="background-color:#dcdcdc"|
|-
| style="text-align:left;" colspan="5" |Invalid/blank votes||
|-
| colspan="5" style="text-align:left;" | Total votes (voter turnout: %) ||  || 100.00 || 26 || 100.00 || 0
|-
| style="text-align:left;" colspan="5" |Did not vote||  ||rowspan="4" colspan="4" style="background-color:#dcdcdc"|
|-
| style="text-align:left;" colspan="5" |Registered voters|| 
|-
| style="text-align:left;" colspan="5" |Voting age population (aged 21 years and above)|| 
|-
| style="text-align:left;" colspan="5" |Kedah's population|| 
|-
| style="text-align:left;" colspan=10 |
Source:
|}

Kelantan

|-
! rowspan=2 colspan=4 style="background-color:#E9E9E9;text-align:center;" | Party
! rowspan=2 style="background-color:#E9E9E9;text-align:center;" |Candidates
! colspan=2 style="background-color:#E9E9E9;text-align:center;" |Vote
! colspan=3 style="background-color:#E9E9E9;text-align:center;" |Seats
|-
! style="background-color:#E9E9E9;text-align:center;" |Votes
! style="background-color:#E9E9E9;text-align:center;" |%
! style="background-color:#E9E9E9;text-align:center;" |Won
! style="background-color:#E9E9E9;text-align:center;" |%
! style="background-color:#E9E9E9;text-align:center;" |+/–
|-
| style="background-color: ;" |
| colspan=2 style="text-align:left;" | National Front || BN ||  ||  ||  || 23 || 63.89 || -13
|-style="background:#EFEFEF;"
| rowspan=2|
| style="background-color: #E62020;" | 
| style="text-align:left;" |United Malays National Organisation || UMNO ||  ||  ||  || 22 || 61.11 || +9
|-style="background:#EFEFEF;"
| style="background-color: #0000FF;" | 
| style="text-align:left;" |Malaysian Chinese Association || MCA ||  ||  ||  || 1 || 2.78 || 0
|-
| style="background-color: ;" |
| colspan=2 style="text-align:left;" |Pan-Malaysian Islamic Front|| BERJASA ||  ||  ||  || 11 || 30.56 || New
|-
| style="background-color: ;" |
| colspan=2 style="text-align:left;" |Pan-Malaysian Islamic Party|| PAS ||  ||  ||  || 2 || 5.56 || -20
|-
| style="text-align:left;" colspan="5" |Valid votes||  ||rowspan=2 colspan="4" style="background-color:#dcdcdc"|
|-
| style="text-align:left;" colspan="5" |Invalid/blank votes||
|-
| colspan="5" style="text-align:left;" | Total votes (voter turnout: %) ||   || 100.00 || 36 || 100.00 || 0
|-
| style="text-align:left;" colspan="5" |Did not vote||  ||rowspan="4" colspan="4" style="background-color:#dcdcdc"|
|-
| style="text-align:left;" colspan="5" |Registered voters|| 
|-
| style="text-align:left;" colspan="5" |Voting age population (aged 21 years and above)|| 
|-
| style="text-align:left;" colspan="5" |Kelantan's population|| 
|-
| style="text-align:left;" colspan=10 |
Source:
|}

Malacca

|-
! rowspan=2 colspan=4 style="background-color:#E9E9E9;text-align:center;" | Party
! rowspan=2 style="background-color:#E9E9E9;text-align:center;" |Candidates
! colspan=2 style="background-color:#E9E9E9;text-align:center;" |Vote
! colspan=3 style="background-color:#E9E9E9;text-align:center;" |Seats
|-
! style="background-color:#E9E9E9;text-align:center;" |Votes
! style="background-color:#E9E9E9;text-align:center;" |%
! style="background-color:#E9E9E9;text-align:center;" |Won
! style="background-color:#E9E9E9;text-align:center;" |%
! style="background-color:#E9E9E9;text-align:center;" |+/–
|- 
| style="background-color: ;" |
| colspan=2 style="text-align:left;" | National Front || BN || 20 ||  ||  || 16 || 80.00 || 0
|-style="background:#EFEFEF;"
| rowspan=3|
| style="background-color: #E62020;" | 
| style="text-align:left;" |United Malays National Organisation || UMNO ||  ||  ||  || 13 || 65.00 || +1
|-style="background:#EFEFEF;"
| style="background-color: #0000FF;" | 
| style="text-align:left;" |Malaysian Chinese Association || MCA ||  ||  ||  || 3 || 15.00 || 0
|-style="background:#EFEFEF;"
| style="background-color: #29AB87;" |
| style="text-align:left;" |Malaysian Indian Congress || MIC ||  ||  ||  || 0 || 0.00 || 0
|-
| style="background-color: ;" |
| colspan=2 style="text-align:left;" |Democratic Action Party||DAP||  ||  ||  || 4 || 20.00 || 0
|-
| style="background-color: ;" |
| colspan=2 style="text-align:left;" |Pan-Malaysian Islamic Party|| PAS ||  ||  ||  || 0 || 0.00 || -1
|-
| style="text-align:left;" colspan="5" |Valid votes||  ||rowspan=2 colspan="4" style="background-color:#dcdcdc"|
|-
| style="text-align:left;" colspan="5" |Invalid/blank votes||
|-
| colspan="5" style="text-align:left;" | Total votes (voter turnout: %) ||   || 100.00 || 20 || 100.00 || 0
|-
| style="text-align:left;" colspan="5" |Did not vote||  ||rowspan="4" colspan="4" style="background-color:#dcdcdc"|
|-
| style="text-align:left;" colspan="5" |Registered voters|| 
|-
| style="text-align:left;" colspan="5" |Voting age population (aged 21 years and above)|| 
|-
| style="text-align:left;" colspan="5" |Malacca's population|| 
|-
| style="text-align:left;" colspan=10 |
Source:
|}

Negri Sembilan

|-
! rowspan=2 colspan=4 style="background-color:#E9E9E9;text-align:center;" | Party
! rowspan=2 style="background-color:#E9E9E9;text-align:center;" |Candidates
! colspan=2 style="background-color:#E9E9E9;text-align:center;" |Vote
! colspan=3 style="background-color:#E9E9E9;text-align:center;" |Seats
|-
! style="background-color:#E9E9E9;text-align:center;" |Votes
! style="background-color:#E9E9E9;text-align:center;" |%
! style="background-color:#E9E9E9;text-align:center;" |Won
! style="background-color:#E9E9E9;text-align:center;" |%
! style="background-color:#E9E9E9;text-align:center;" |+/–
|- 
| style="background-color: ;" |
| colspan=2 style="text-align:left;" | National Front || BN || 24 ||  ||  || 21 || 87.50 || 0
|-style="background:#EFEFEF;"
| rowspan=3|
| style="background-color: #E62020;" | 
| style="text-align:left;" |United Malays National Organisation || UMNO ||  ||  ||  || 15 || 62.50 || +1
|-style="background:#EFEFEF;"
| style="background-color: #0000FF;" | 
| style="text-align:left;" |Malaysian Chinese Association || MCA ||  ||  ||  || 5 || 20.83 || 0
|-style="background:#EFEFEF;"
| style="background-color: #29AB87;" |
| style="text-align:left;" |Malaysian Indian Congress || MIC ||  ||  ||  || 1 || 4.17 || 0
|-
| style="background-color: ;" |
| colspan=2 style="text-align:left;" |Democratic Action Party||DAP||  ||  ||  || 3 || 12.50 || 0
|-
| style="background-color: ;" |
| colspan=2 style="text-align:left;" |Pan-Malaysian Islamic Party|| PAS ||  ||  ||  || 0 || 0.00 || -1
|-
| style="text-align:left;" colspan="5" |Valid votes||  ||rowspan=2 colspan="4" style="background-color:#dcdcdc"|
|-
| style="text-align:left;" colspan="5" |Invalid/blank votes||
|-
| colspan="5" style="text-align:left;" | Total votes (voter turnout: %) ||   || 100.00 || 24 || 100.00 || 0
|-
| style="text-align:left;" colspan="5" |Did not vote||  ||rowspan="4" colspan="4" style="background-color:#dcdcdc"|
|-
| style="text-align:left;" colspan="5" |Registered voters|| 
|-
| style="text-align:left;" colspan="5" |Voting age population (aged 21 years and above)|| 
|-
| style="text-align:left;" colspan="5" |Negri Sembilan's population|| 
|-
| style="text-align:left;" colspan=10 |
Source:
|}

Pahang

|-
! rowspan=2 colspan=4 style="background-color:#E9E9E9;text-align:center;" | Party
! rowspan=2 style="background-color:#E9E9E9;text-align:center;" |Candidates
! colspan=2 style="background-color:#E9E9E9;text-align:center;" |Vote
! colspan=3 style="background-color:#E9E9E9;text-align:center;" |Seats
|-
! style="background-color:#E9E9E9;text-align:center;" |Votes
! style="background-color:#E9E9E9;text-align:center;" |%
! style="background-color:#E9E9E9;text-align:center;" |Won
! style="background-color:#E9E9E9;text-align:center;" |%
! style="background-color:#E9E9E9;text-align:center;" |+/–
|- 
| style="background-color: ;" |
| colspan=2 style="text-align:left;" | National Front || BN || 32 ||  ||  || 32 || 100.00 || 0
|-style="background:#EFEFEF;"
| rowspan=4|
| style="background-color: #E62020;" | 
| style="text-align:left;" |United Malays National Organisation || UMNO ||  ||  ||  ||  ||  || 
|-style="background:#EFEFEF;"
| style="background-color: #0000FF;" | 
| style="text-align:left;" |Malaysian Chinese Association || MCA ||  ||  ||  ||  ||  || 
|-style="background:#EFEFEF;"
| style="background-color: #FF0000;" |
| style="text-align:left;" |Malaysian People's Movement Party||Gerakan||  ||  ||  ||  ||  || 
|-style="background:#EFEFEF;"
| style="background-color: #29AB87;" |
| style="text-align:left;" |Malaysian Indian Congress || MIC ||  ||  ||  ||  ||  ||
|-
| style="background-color: ;" |
| colspan=2 style="text-align:left;" |Pan-Malaysian Islamic Party|| PAS ||  ||  ||  || 0 || 0.00 || -1
|-
| style="text-align:left;" colspan="5" |Valid votes||  ||rowspan=2 colspan="4" style="background-color:#dcdcdc"|
|-
| style="text-align:left;" colspan="5" |Invalid/blank votes||
|-
| colspan="5" style="text-align:left;" | Total votes (voter turnout: %) ||   || 100.00 || 32 || 100.00 || 0
|-
| style="text-align:left;" colspan="5" |Did not vote||  ||rowspan="4" colspan="4" style="background-color:#dcdcdc"|
|-
| style="text-align:left;" colspan="5" |Registered voters|| 
|-
| style="text-align:left;" colspan="5" |Voting age population (aged 21 years and above)|| 
|-
| style="text-align:left;" colspan="5" |Pahang's population|| 
|-
| style="text-align:left;" colspan=10 |
Source:
|}

Penang

|-
! rowspan=2 colspan=4 style="background-color:#E9E9E9;text-align:center;" | Party
! rowspan=2 style="background-color:#E9E9E9;text-align:center;" |Candidates
! colspan=2 style="background-color:#E9E9E9;text-align:center;" |Vote
! colspan=3 style="background-color:#E9E9E9;text-align:center;" |Seats
|-
! style="background-color:#E9E9E9;text-align:center;" |Votes
! style="background-color:#E9E9E9;text-align:center;" |%
! style="background-color:#E9E9E9;text-align:center;" |Won
! style="background-color:#E9E9E9;text-align:center;" |%
! style="background-color:#E9E9E9;text-align:center;" |+/–
|-
| style="background-color: ;" |
| colspan=2 style="text-align:left;" | National Front || BN || 27 ||  ||  || 20 || 74.07 || -3
|-style="background:#EFEFEF;"
| rowspan=4|
| style="background-color: #E62020;" | 
| style="text-align:left;" |United Malays National Organisation || UMNO || 10 ||  ||  || 9 || 33.33 || 0
|-style="background:#EFEFEF;"
| style="background-color: #FF0000;" |
| style="text-align:left;" |Malaysian People's Movement Party||Gerakan|| 11 ||  ||  || 8 || 29.63 || -3
|-style="background:#EFEFEF;"
| style="background-color: #0000FF;" | 
| style="text-align:left;" |Malaysian Chinese Association || MCA || 5 ||  ||  || 2 || 7.41 || +1
|-style="background:#EFEFEF;"
| style="background-color: #29AB87;" |
| style="text-align:left;" |Malaysian Indian Congress || MIC || 1 ||  ||  || 1 || 3.70 || 0
|-
| style="background-color: ;" |
| colspan=2 style="text-align:left;" |Democratic Action Party||DAP||  ||  ||  || 5 || 18.52 || +3
|-
| style="background-color: ;" |
| colspan=2 style="text-align:left;" |Pan-Malaysian Islamic Party|| PAS ||  ||  ||  || 1 || 3.70 || 0
|-
| style="background-color: ;" |
| colspan=2 style="text-align:left;" |Independents||IND||  ||  ||  || 1 || 3.70 || 0
|-
| style="text-align:left;" colspan="5" |Valid votes||  ||rowspan=2 colspan="4" style="background-color:#dcdcdc"|
|-
| style="text-align:left;" colspan="5" |Invalid/blank votes||
|-
| colspan="5" style="text-align:left;" | Total votes (voter turnout: %) ||   || 100.00 || 27 || 100.00 || 0
|-
| style="text-align:left;" colspan="5" |Did not vote||  ||rowspan="4" colspan="4" style="background-color:#dcdcdc"|
|-
| style="text-align:left;" colspan="5" |Registered voters|| 
|-
| style="text-align:left;" colspan="5" |Voting age population (aged 21 years and above)|| 
|-
| style="text-align:left;" colspan="5" |Penang's population|| 
|-
| style="text-align:left;" colspan=10 |
Source:
|}

Perak

|-
! rowspan=2 colspan=4 style="background-color:#E9E9E9;text-align:center;" | Party
! rowspan=2 style="background-color:#E9E9E9;text-align:center;" |Candidates
! colspan=2 style="background-color:#E9E9E9;text-align:center;" |Vote
! colspan=3 style="background-color:#E9E9E9;text-align:center;" |Seats
|-
! style="background-color:#E9E9E9;text-align:center;" |Votes
! style="background-color:#E9E9E9;text-align:center;" |%
! style="background-color:#E9E9E9;text-align:center;" |Won
! style="background-color:#E9E9E9;text-align:center;" |%
! style="background-color:#E9E9E9;text-align:center;" |+/–
|- 
| style="background-color: ;" |
| colspan=2 style="text-align:left;" | National Front || BN || 42 ||  ||  || 32 || 76.19 || +1
|-style="background:#EFEFEF;"
| rowspan=5|
| style="background-color: #E62020;" | 
| style="text-align:left;" |United Malays National Organisation || UMNO ||  ||  ||  || 23 || 54.76 || +2
|-style="background:#EFEFEF;"
| style="background-color: #0000FF;" | 
| style="text-align:left;" |Malaysian Chinese Association || MCA ||  ||  ||  || 4 || 9.52 || +1
|-style="background:#EFEFEF;"
| style="background-color: #DAA520;" |
| style="text-align:left;" |People's Progressive Party||PPP||  ||  ||  || 2 || 4.76 || 0
|-style="background:#EFEFEF;"
| style="background-color: #FF0000;" |
| style="text-align:left;" |Malaysian People's Movement Party||Gerakan||  ||  ||  || 2 || 4.76 || +1
|-style="background:#EFEFEF;"
| style="background-color: #29AB87;" | 
| style="text-align:left;" |Malaysian Indian Congress || MIC ||  ||  ||  || 1 || 2.38 || 0
|-
| style="background-color: ;" |
| colspan=2 style="text-align:left;" |Democratic Action Party||DAP||  ||  ||  || 9 || 21.43 || -2
|-
| style="background-color: ;" |
| colspan=2 style="text-align:left;" |Pan-Malaysian Islamic Party|| PAS ||  ||  ||  || 1 || 2.38 || -2
|-
| style="text-align:left;" colspan="5" |Valid votes||  ||rowspan=2 colspan="4" style="background-color:#dcdcdc"|
|-
| style="text-align:left;" colspan="5" |Invalid/blank votes||
|-
| colspan="5" style="text-align:left;" | Total votes (voter turnout: %) ||   || 100.00 || 42 || 100.00 || 0
|-
| style="text-align:left;" colspan="5" |Did not vote||  ||rowspan="4" colspan="4" style="background-color:#dcdcdc"|
|-
| style="text-align:left;" colspan="5" |Registered voters|| 
|-
| style="text-align:left;" colspan="5" |Voting age population (aged 21 years and above)|| 
|-
| style="text-align:left;" colspan="5" |Perak's population|| 
|-
| style="text-align:left;" colspan=10 |
Source:
|}

Perlis

|-
! rowspan=2 colspan=4 style="background-color:#E9E9E9;text-align:center;" | Party
! rowspan=2 style="background-color:#E9E9E9;text-align:center;" |Candidates
! colspan=2 style="background-color:#E9E9E9;text-align:center;" |Vote
! colspan=3 style="background-color:#E9E9E9;text-align:center;" |Seats
|-
! style="background-color:#E9E9E9;text-align:center;" |Votes
! style="background-color:#E9E9E9;text-align:center;" |%
! style="background-color:#E9E9E9;text-align:center;" |Won
! style="background-color:#E9E9E9;text-align:center;" |%
! style="background-color:#E9E9E9;text-align:center;" |+/–
|-
| style="background-color: ;" |
| colspan=2 style="text-align:left;" | National Front || BN || 12 ||  ||  || 12 || 100.00 || 0
|-style="background:#EFEFEF;"
| rowspan=2|
| style="background-color: #E62020;" | 
| style="text-align:left;" |United Malays National Organisation || UMNO || 10 ||  ||  || 10 || 83.33 || +2
|-style="background:#EFEFEF;"
| style="background-color: #0000FF;" | 
| style="text-align:left;" |Malaysian Chinese Association || MCA || 2 ||  ||  || 2 || 16.67 || 0
|-
| style="background-color: ;" |
| colspan=2 style="text-align:left;" |Pan-Malaysian Islamic Party|| PAS ||  ||  ||  || 0 || 0.00 || -2
|-
| style="text-align:left;" colspan="5" |Valid votes||  ||rowspan=2 colspan="4" style="background-color:#dcdcdc"|
|-
| style="text-align:left;" colspan="5" |Invalid/blank votes||
|-
| colspan="5" style="text-align:left;" | Total votes (voter turnout: %) ||   || 100.00 || 12 || 100.00 || 0
|-
| style="text-align:left;" colspan="5" |Did not vote||  ||rowspan="4" colspan="4" style="background-color:#dcdcdc"|
|-
| style="text-align:left;" colspan="5" |Registered voters|| 
|-
| style="text-align:left;" colspan="5" |Voting age population (aged 21 years and above)|| 
|-
| style="text-align:left;" colspan="5" |Perlis's population|| 
|-
| style="text-align:left;" colspan=10 |
Source:
|}

Selangor

|-
! rowspan=2 colspan=4 style="background-color:#E9E9E9;text-align:center;" | Party
! rowspan=2 style="background-color:#E9E9E9;text-align:center;" |Candidates
! colspan=2 style="background-color:#E9E9E9;text-align:center;" |Vote
! colspan=3 style="background-color:#E9E9E9;text-align:center;" |Seats
|-
! style="background-color:#E9E9E9;text-align:center;" |Votes
! style="background-color:#E9E9E9;text-align:center;" |%
! style="background-color:#E9E9E9;text-align:center;" |Won
! style="background-color:#E9E9E9;text-align:center;" |%
! style="background-color:#E9E9E9;text-align:center;" |+/–
|- 
| style="background-color: ;" |
| colspan=2 style="text-align:left;" | National Front || BN || 33 ||  ||  || 29 || 87.88 || -1
|-style="background:#EFEFEF;"
| rowspan=4|
| style="background-color: #E62020;" | 
| style="text-align:left;" |United Malays National Organisation || UMNO ||  ||  ||  || 20 || 60.61 || +1
|-style="background:#EFEFEF;"
| style="background-color: #0000FF;" | 
| style="text-align:left;" |Malaysian Chinese Association || MCA ||  ||  ||  || 5 || 15.15 || -1
|-style="background:#EFEFEF;"
| style="background-color: #29AB87;" |
| style="text-align:left;" |Malaysian Indian Congress || MIC ||  ||  ||  || 3 || 9.09 || 0
|-style="background:#EFEFEF;"
| style="background-color: #FF0000;" |
| style="text-align:left;" |Malaysian People's Movement Party||Gerakan||  ||  ||  || 1 || 3.03 || 0
|-
| style="background-color: ;" |
| colspan=2 style="text-align:left;" |Democratic Action Party||DAP||  ||  ||  || 3 || 9.09 || +2
|-
| style="background-color: ;" |
| colspan=2 style="text-align:left;" |Pan-Malaysian Islamic Party|| PAS ||  ||  ||  || 0 || 0.00 || -1
|-
| style="background-color: ;" |
| colspan=2 style="text-align:left;" |Independents||IND||  ||  ||  || 1 || 3.03 || -1
|-
| style="text-align:left;" colspan="5" |Valid votes||  ||rowspan=2 colspan="4" style="background-color:#dcdcdc"|
|-
| style="text-align:left;" colspan="5" |Invalid/blank votes||
|-
| colspan="5" style="text-align:left;" | Total votes (voter turnout: %) ||   || 100.00 || 33 || 100.00 || 0
|-
| style="text-align:left;" colspan="5" |Did not vote||  ||rowspan="4" colspan="4" style="background-color:#dcdcdc"|
|-
| style="text-align:left;" colspan="5" |Registered voters|| 
|-
| style="text-align:left;" colspan="5" |Voting age population (aged 21 years and above)|| 
|-
| style="text-align:left;" colspan="5" |Selangor's population|| 
|-
| style="text-align:left;" colspan=10 |
Source:
|}

Trengganu

|-
! rowspan=2 colspan=4 style="background-color:#E9E9E9;text-align:center;" | Party
! rowspan=2 style="background-color:#E9E9E9;text-align:center;" |Candidates
! colspan=2 style="background-color:#E9E9E9;text-align:center;" |Vote
! colspan=3 style="background-color:#E9E9E9;text-align:center;" |Seats
|-
! style="background-color:#E9E9E9;text-align:center;" |Votes
! style="background-color:#E9E9E9;text-align:center;" |%
! style="background-color:#E9E9E9;text-align:center;" |Won
! style="background-color:#E9E9E9;text-align:center;" |%
! style="background-color:#E9E9E9;text-align:center;" |+/–
|-
| style="background-color: ;" |
| colspan=2 style="text-align:left;" | National Front || BN || 28 ||  ||  || 28 || 100.00 || +1
|-style="background:#EFEFEF;"
| rowspan=2|
| style="background-color: #E62020;" | 
| style="text-align:left;" |United Malays National Organisation || UMNO || 27 ||  ||  || 27 || 96.43 || +10
|-style="background:#EFEFEF;"
| style="background-color: #0000FF;" | 
| style="text-align:left;" |Malaysian Chinese Association || MCA || 1 ||  ||  || 1 || 3.57 || 0
|-
| style="background-color: ;" |
| colspan=2 style="text-align:left;" |Pan-Malaysian Islamic Party|| PAS ||  ||  ||  || 0 || 0.00 || -9
|-
| style="text-align:left;" colspan="5" |Valid votes||  ||rowspan=2 colspan="4" style="background-color:#dcdcdc"|
|-
| style="text-align:left;" colspan="5" |Invalid/blank votes||
|-
| colspan="5" style="text-align:left;" | Total votes (voter turnout: %) ||   || 100.00 || 28 || 100.00 || 0
|-
| style="text-align:left;" colspan="5" |Did not vote||  ||rowspan="4" colspan="4" style="background-color:#dcdcdc"|
|-
| style="text-align:left;" colspan="5" |Registered voters|| 
|-
| style="text-align:left;" colspan="5" |Voting age population (aged 21 years and above)|| 
|-
| style="text-align:left;" colspan="5" |Trengganu's population|| 
|-
| style="text-align:left;" colspan=10 |
Source:
|}

References

1978
1978 elections in Malaysia